Richard Donisthorp (fl. 1797) was an English clockmaker in Loughborough. He used the surname (spelt Donisthorp) as an engraved signature on the clock faces he made and was a member of the Donisthorp family, who were Leicestershire clockmakers. The name of Donisthorp appears in records also as Donisthorpe.

References
 

English clockmakers
People from Loughborough
Year of death unknown
18th-century English people
Year of birth unknown